Procottus major is a species of ray-finned fish belonging to the family Cottidae, the typical sculpins. This species is endemic to Lake Baikal in Siberia. It was originally described as a subspecies of the similar but smaller red sculpin (P. jeittelesii). This species is fished and its young are an important food source for other fish.

References

major
Fish described in 1949
Taxa named by Dmitrii Nikolaevich Taliev
Endemic fauna of Russia
Fish of Lake Baikal